El Fell Mosque  or 'mosque of the chance' is a small mosque located in the Azzafine hood in the Medina of Tunis.

Localization
The mosque is located in 101 the Kasbah street near the entrance of Souk En Nhas.

History 
According to the historian Mohamed Belkhodja, it was built by the Zirids, a dynasty that ruled the whole Maghreb region from 972 and 1014, and then a part of it (Ifriqiya) until 1148.

Etymology
People visit the mosque to get some luck while the Ulamas disagree with this belief.

References 

Berber architecture
11th-century mosques
Mosques in Tunis